is a former Japanese football player.

Club statistics
Updated to 22 January 2016.

References

External links

1983 births
Living people
Meiji University alumni
Association football people from Hiroshima Prefecture
Japanese footballers
J1 League players
J2 League players
J3 League players
Sagan Tosu players
Hokkaido Consadole Sapporo players
Kataller Toyama players
Association football defenders